Rachel Louise Hopkins (born 30 March 1972) is a British politician who has served as Member of Parliament (MP) for Luton South since 2019. A member of the Labour Party, she has been a Shadow Minister for the Cabinet Office since 2021.

Hopkins was a Member of Luton Borough Council from 2011 to 2021, on which she served as Executive Member for Public Health.

Early life and career 
Hopkins was born in Luton and Dunstable University Hospital and raised in Biscot. She attended Denbigh High School and then Luton Sixth Form College before going on to study at the University of Leicester. Her first full-time job was at TSB Bank. She later studied part-time for a master's degree from the University of Bedfordshire.

Hopkins previously worked at the Electoral Commission and the Human Fertilisation and Embryology Authority. She has been a governor for Luton Sixth Form College since 2014.

Hopkins served on Luton Borough Council from May 2011 until her resignation in March 2021, and was Executive Member for Public Health on the Council.

Parliamentary career 
On Friday 1 November 2019, she was selected as the Labour candidate for the Luton South constituency. She was selected by a panel of four, rather than by the local membership. She won the 2019 United Kingdom general election for Luton South with 51.8% of the vote.

Hopkins is considered to be on the left of the Labour Party and a member of the left-wing Socialist Campaign Group. She voted for Brexit in the 2016 EU referendum, making her one of the few known Labour MPs to have done so.

She was appointed Parliamentary Private Secretary (PPS) to the Shadow Women and Equalities Secretary, Marsha de Cordova, in May 2020. Hopkins resigned from the position to vote against the Covert Human Intelligence Sources (Criminal Conduct) Bill, rebelling against the Labour whip. She became a PPS once again in May 2021, this time to Shadow Defence Secretary John Healey.

Hopkins was appointed as a Shadow Cabinet Office Minister in the December 2021 opposition front bench reshuffle.

Personal life
She currently lives in High Town, Luton with her partner, Iain. Her father, Kelvin, served as MP for Luton North from 1997 to 2019. Her grandfather, Harold, was a physicist twice nominated for a Nobel Prize.

A humanist, she was elected Vice Chair of the All-Party Parliamentary Humanist Group in 2022.

References

External links

Living people
1972 births
21st-century British women politicians
English humanists
Alumni of the University of Bedfordshire
Alumni of the University of Leicester
Female members of the Parliament of the United Kingdom for English constituencies
Councillors in Bedfordshire
Labour Party (UK) councillors
Labour Party (UK) MPs for English constituencies
People from Luton
UK MPs 2019–present
21st-century English women
21st-century English people
Women councillors in England